Moradlu District is in Meshgin Shahr County, Ardabil province, Iran. At the 2006 census, its population was 13,750 in 2,973 households. The following census in 2011 counted 11,744 people in 2,957 households. At the latest census in 2016, the district had 10,032 inhabitants living in 2,906 households.

References 

Meshgin Shahr County

Districts of Ardabil Province

Populated places in Ardabil Province

Populated places in Meshgin Shahr County